Martin Rõigas (also Mart Rõigas; 22 October 1908 – 13 July 1941) was an Estonian politician. He was a member of VI Riigikogu (its Chamber of Deputies).

Martin Rõigas was born in Abja Parish (now Mulgi Parish) in Kreis Pernau to farmers Hans and Maria "Marri" Rõigas (née Meltsas). He attended schools in Puhja before studying at the University of Tartu. Following the Soviet occupation of Estonia in 1940, he was killed by Red Army soldiers in Vara Parish in 1941, aged 32.

References

1908 births
1941 deaths
People from Mulgi Parish
People from Kreis Pernau
Patriotic League (Estonia) politicians
Members of the Estonian National Assembly
Members of the Riigivolikogu
University of Tartu alumni
Estonian people executed by the Soviet Union